Sushant Jayachandra Modani (born  5 January 1989) is an Indian-born American cricketer who plays for the United States cricket team. In June 2021, he was selected to take part in the Minor League Cricket tournament in the United States following the players' draft. In August 2021, Modani was named in the United States' One Day International (ODI) squad for the rescheduled tri-series in Oman and their matches against Papua New Guinea. He made his ODI debut on 6 September 2021, for the United States against Papua New Guinea. He made his T20I debut on 22 December 2021, for the United States against Ireland.

References

External links
 

1989 births
Living people
People from Jalna, Maharashtra
American cricketers
Indian cricketers
United States One Day International cricketers
United States Twenty20 International cricketers
Cricketers from Maharashtra
Indian emigrants to the United States
American sportspeople of Indian descent